Stuart Davis is the ninth studio album released by Stuart Davis.

Track listing
"Surfaces"
"Babies"
"Rock Stars And Models"
"Dresden"
"Fault Lines"
"Invincible"
"Savoring Samsara"
"Doppelganger Body Donor"
"Immanence
"Ladder"
"Dive"
"Swim"
"Drown"

References

2001 albums